Nay Aung  is a three-time Myanmar Academy Award winning film actor in Myanmar . He gained popularity after starring in the film  Thingyan Moe(Rain in the Water Festival) .

Awards and nominations

References

External links
 

Burmese male film actors
Living people
People from Yangon
Year of birth missing (living people)
20th-century Burmese male actors
21st-century Burmese male actors